The Walvis Bay-Ndola-Lubumbashi Development Road (previously Trans-Caprivi Corridor and until 2004 Trans-Caprivi-Highway) runs from Walvis Bay, through Rundu in north eastern Namibia, along the Caprivi Strip to Katima Mulilo on the Zambezi River, which forms the border between Namibia and Zambia. The Katima Mulilo Bridge spans the river to the Zambian town of Sesheke from where a recently upgraded paved road runs to Livingstone (the M10 Road) joining the main north–south highway to Lusaka, connecting onwards to the Copperbelt.

The Trans-Caprivi highway is a section of the Walvis Bay Corridor, a trade route linking land-locked Zambia (and neighbouring countries such as DR Congo, Malawi and Zimbabwe) to the Walvis Bay port on the Atlantic Ocean. An example of the function of the corridor as a trade route is that trucks carry copper ore concentrate from the Dikulushi Mine in South-East DR Congo across Zambia and down the Trans-Caprivi highway to the copper smelter at Tsumeb in Namibia. The refined copper is then exported from Namibian ports.

Route 
As the name suggests, the corridor starts at Walvis Bay (in Namibia), passes through Ndola (in Zambia) and ends at Lubumbashi (in DR Congo).

The corridor begins in the coastal town of Walvis Bay as the B2 road, heading northwards to the coastal town of Swakopmund (a distance of 35km), where it turns eastwards. It heads eastwards from Swakopmund, through Karibib, to the town of Okahandja (a distance of 290km), where it reaches a junction with the B1 road. At this junction, the B2 ends and the corridor becomes the B1 northwards. The entire section from Walvis Bay to Okahandja is shared with the Trans-Kalahari Corridor.

From Okahandja, it heads northwards as the B1 for 290km, through Otjiwarongo, to the town of Otavi (south-west of Tsumeb), where it reaches a junction with the B8 road. At this junction, the corridor becomes the B8 east-north-east and heads for 345km to the town of Rundu, where it meets the B10 road and becomes the main road through the Caprivi Strip. The section from Okahandja to Otavi is shared with the Tripoli–Cape Town Highway.

The corridor resumes being the B8 road and heads eastwards from Rundu for 510km to the border town of Katima Mulilo, where it crosses the national boundary in a northerly direction to enter Zambia. Immediately after crossing the border, it reaches a junction with Zambia's M10 road. The corridor becomes the M10 and immediately crosses the Zambezi River in a north-easterly direction as the Katima Mulilo Bridge to enter the town of Sesheke.

From Sesheke, the corridor heads eastwards as the M10 for 135km to the small town of Kazungula, where it meets the M19 road (which provides access to the near Kazungula Bridge border with Botswana). From Kazungula, it heads eastwards for 70 kilometres as the M10 to the city of Livingstone (10 km north of the Victoria Falls), where it reaches a junction with the T1 road. At this junction, the M10 ends and the corridor becomes the T1 north-eastwards.

From Livingstone, it heads north-east as the T1 for 420km, through Choma, to reach a junction with the T2 road (Zambia's Great North Road) about 10km south of Kafue. At this junction, the T1 ends and the corridor becomes the T2 northwards. It heads northwards as the T2 for 55km to the city of Lusaka (capital city of Zambia). From Lusaka, it heads northwards as the T2 for 200km, through Kabwe, to Kapiri Mposhi, where it reaches a junction with the T3 road and enters the Copperbelt region. At this junction, the corridor becomes the T3 northwards. The section from Livingstone to Kapiri Mposhi is shared with the Cairo-Cape Town Highway.

From Kapiri Mposhi, it heads northwards as the T3 for 170km, through the city of Ndola, to the city of Kitwe. From Kitwe, it heads northwards for 90km, through Chingola, to the border town of Kasumbalesa, where it crosses the national boundary in a northerly direction to enter DR Congo and become the N1 route. From Kasumbalesa, the corridor heads north-north-west as the N1 route for 100 kilometres to the city of Lubumbashi. The section from Kafue (south of Lusaka) to Lubumbashi is shared with the Beira–Lobito Highway.

See also
Trans-African Highway network

References

Namport (National Ports Authority of Namibia) website accessed 16 February 2007.
African Development Bank/United Nations Economic Commission For Africa: "Review of the Implementation Status of the Trans African Highways and the Missing Links: Volume 2: Description of Corridors". August 14, 2003. Retrieved 14 July 2007.
Michelin Motoring and Tourist Maps: "955: Africa Central and South" (2000), "953: Africa North and West" (1996), "954 Africa North-East and Arabia" (1998).  Michelin Travel Publications, Paris. 

Roads in Namibia
Roads in Zambia
International road networks
Zambezi Region
Road transport in Africa
Roads in the Democratic Republic of the Congo